Anzick-1 is a Paleo-Indian male infant whose remains were found in south central Montana, United States, in 1968, and date to 13,000–12,850 years BP. The child was found with more than 115 tools made of stone and antlers and dusted with red ocher, suggesting an honorary burial. Anzick-1 is the only human who has been discovered from the Clovis Complex, and is the first ancient Native American genome to be fully sequenced.

Paleogenomic analysis of the remains revealed Siberian ancestry and a close genetic relationship to modern Native Americans, including those of Central and South America. These findings support the hypothesis that modern Native Americans are descended from Asian populations who crossed Beringia between 23,000 and 14,000 years ago.

Anzick-1's discovery and subsequent analysis has been controversial. The remains were found on private land, so compliance with the Native American Graves Protection and Repatriation Act (NAGPRA) was not required in their study. Some Native American tribal members in Montana felt they should have been consulted before the researchers undertook analysis of the infant's skeleton and genome. Montana State law does require consultation with Native Americans concerning disposition of ancient skeletal remains.

After consultation Anzick-1 was reburied on June 28, 2014, in the Shields River Valley in an intertribal ceremony. The numerous Clovis artifacts associated with the first burial are curated at the Montana Historical Society in Helena, Montana.

Discovery 
The Anzick site was accidentally discovered by a construction worker in a collapsed rock shelter near Wilsall, Montana, on private land. The remains were found on the ranch of the Anzick family.

The Anzick-1 remains were found buried under numerous tools: 100 stone tools and 15 remnants of tools made of antler. The site contained hundreds of stone projectile points, bifaces and flake tools, as well as a skull fragment of a second individual dated to circa 9900–9550 years ago and is not associated with Anzick-1 . All of the artifacts were covered in red ocher. The stone points were identified as part of the Clovis Complex because of their distinct shape and size. Originally, the two human skeletons were both thought to be contemporaneous with the Clovis Complex stone points, but later carbon dating revealed that only one of the human skeletons, Anzick-1, was from the Clovis period. Anzick-1 predates the other skeleton by over two millennia.

Osteological findings 
Anzick-1's skeletal remains included 28 cranial fragments, the left clavicle, and several ribs. These bones were discovered in highly fragmented states; however, partial reconstruction of the crania allowed for age estimation, investigation of basic health indicators, and some information about cultural practices. Originally, investigators thought the left clavicle showed evidence of cremation, but further analysis revealed that the discoloration was the result of groundwater staining and not fire. Additionally, all of the Anzick-1 remains were stained with ocher, which masks the natural color of the infant's bones.

Age estimation 
The age at death of an individual can be determined from several skeletal markers, including cranial suture closure, tooth eruption rates, rates of epiphyseal fusion on long bones, and others. Cranial bones fuse together along suture lines throughout the life of every human, and can be used to estimate the age at death of human remains. The small size and lack of suture closure of Anzick-1's crania revealed that the individual was 1–2 years old. The metopic suture is also present in the frontal bone of Anzick-1. This suture is present in most human infants but closes well before adulthood. The presence of a frontal suture in Anzick-1's remains corroborates the age estimation of 1–2 years old.

Skeletal markers of health 
Cranial bones can also be useful for detecting evidence of physiological perturbations. The reconstructed frontal, parietal, and occipital bone fragments of Anzick-1 were analyzed for these indicators of health; however, the crania showed no evidence of cribra orbitalia or porotic hyperostosis, conditions that can indicate diseases.

Porotic hyperostosis is characterized by porous lesions on the parietal, occipital, and sometimes frontal bones. Cribra orbitalia is another pathological skeletal lesion that manifests as porosity on the orbital roof. Both porotic hyperostosis and cribra orbitalia are indicators of a nutritional deficiency that leads to anemia.

Cranial vault modification 
Many cultures use wrappings and boards to manipulate the malleable cranial bones of infants into different shapes, which may hold cultural and ritual significance. This practice has been recorded historically and in several different bioarchaeological contexts throughout the Americas. The shape of Anzick-1's cranial vault revealed no evidence of cultural cranial vault modification.

Paleogenetic findings
A team of researchers throughout the United States and Europe conducted paleogenetic research on the Anzick-1 skeletal remains. They sequenced the mitochondrial DNA (mtDNA), the full nuclear DNA, and the Y-chromosome, and compared these sequences to those of modern populations throughout the world. The results of these analyses allowed the researchers to make conclusions about ancient migration patterns and the peopling of the Americas.

These analyses revealed that the individual was closely related to Native Americans in Central and South America, instead of being closely related to the people of the Canadian Arctic, as had previously been thought likely. (The people of the Arctic are distinct from Native Americans to the south, including in lower North America and Central and South America.) The infant was also related to persons from Siberia and Central Asia, believed to be the ancestral population of indigenous peoples in the Americas. This finding supports the theory that the peopling of the Americas occurred from Asia across the Bering Strait. For more than 20 years, some anthropologists have debated whether the first settlers who came to the New World did so by crossing a land bridge through the Bering Strait, or by sea from the southwest of Europe, in what is called the Solutrean Hypothesis.

Nuclear DNA analysis 
Human nuclear DNA is located inside the nucleus of every cell and makes up the human genome. Humans inherit half of their nuclear DNA from their mother and half from their father. Throughout human evolution, mutations occur that are inherited in each subsequent generation. Different populations have different frequencies of these mutations, and population histories can be ascertained from these mutations by comparing the mutations of one individual to other genomes from specific ethnic groups.

The genome of Anzick-1 was sequenced and analyzed to look for specific mutations that might shed light on the population history of modern Native Americans. Anzick-1's genome was compared to over 50 Native American genomes for comparison, and researchers found that it was significantly more similar to these than to any modern Eurasian population. Anzick-1's genome was closer to 44 Native American populations from Central and South America than to 7 Native American populations from North America; samples from North America were limited as tribes in the United States have been reluctant to participate.

Mitochondrial DNA analysis 
MtDNA is DNA located in mitochondria, an organelle that is found in human cells. The mitochondria is maternally inherited by all persons, and analysis of the mtDNA can provide information about maternal ancestry. MtDNA genomes are classified into different haplogroups based on a shared common ancestor. These distinct haplogroups provide information about ancient migration patterns.

Morten Rasmussen and Sarah L. Anzick et al. sequenced the mitochondrial DNA of Anzick-1 and determined that the infant represents an ancient migration to North America from Siberia. They found that Anzick-1's mtDNA belongs to the haplogroup D4h3a, a "founder" haplogroup that might represent people taking an early coastal migration route into the Americas. The D haplogroup is also found in modern Native American populations, which provides a link between Anzick-1 and modern Native Americans. Although it is rare in most of today's Native Americans in the US and Canada, D4h3a genes are more common in native people of South America. This suggests a greater genetic complexity among Native Americans than previously thought, including an early divergence in the genetic lineage some 13,000 years ago. One theory suggested that after crossing into North America from Siberia, a group of the first Americans, with the lineage D4h3a, moved south along the Pacific coast and finally, through thousands of years, into Central and South America. Another line may have moved inland, east of the Rocky Mountains, ultimately populating most of what is now the United States and Canada.

Y-chromosome analysis 
The y-chromosome is inherited directly through the paternal line from father to son in each generation. Because males have an x-chromosome and a y-chromosome, and females have two x-chromosomes, the y-chromosome can only be inherited from a male's father. Specific mutations on the y-chromosome can be used to trace the paternal lineage of a male individual. Like mtDNA, these mutations can be grouped and categorized into haplogroups. The y-chromosome of Anzick-1 was sequenced, and researchers determined that his y-chromosome haplogroup is Q-L54*(xM3), one of the major founding lineages of the Americas.

Implications 
Anzick-1's mtDNA, nuclear DNA, and Y-Chromosome analysis revealed a close genetic affinity to modern Native Americans and provided evidence of gene flow from Siberia into the Americas nearly 13,000 years ago, earlier than thought. These findings support the Beringia Hypothesis of the peopling of the Americas and directly refute the Solutrean Hypothesis. Proponents of the latter theory do not think the evidence is in conflict.

Beringia Hypothesis 
The Beringia Hypothesis is the mainstream model for the peopling of the Americas, which posits a migration of early Amerindians from Siberia across a land bridge that spanned the Bering Strait. This hypothesis is supported by genetic and archaeological evidence that places the migration no earlier than 32,000 years ago. Ancient Native Americans could have entered the New World across the Beringian land bridge, and passing south from Alaska through an ice-free corridor in Canada. Another concept is that they used boats to sail along the coast of Siberia, the Beringia land bridge, and the Pacific coast of North America. Archeological evidence at the former area of the land bridge or a coastal path has been lost because of the rise in sea levels. The Anzick-1 paleogenetic analysis lends support to the Beringia Hypothesis theory, showing that humans had arrived in Montana by nearly 13,000 years ago.

Solutrean Hypothesis 
The Solutrean hypothesis is a minor hypothesis in paleontology that posits that a subset of members of the Solutrean Culture of prehistoric Europe are directly ancestral to the Clovis Culture of North America, based primarily on similarities in flint-knapping styles. This belief is popular amongst North American white nationalists, who typically interpret the hypothesis as demonstrating that ethnic Europeans were amongst the first, if not the first settlers of the continental United States. The fact that Anzick-1's genome - the only extant genome from any Clovis site - has no relevant genetic similarity to any European population is generally seen to go some way towards disproving the hypothesis, although it is possible that Anzick-1 represents a subgroup, family or individual of ethnically non-Clovis extraction adopted or assimilated into Clovis culture. Nonetheless, the Anzick-1 results have been commonly cited as representing genetic evidence against the Solutrean hypothesis.

Ethics 
Studying the remains of ancient Native Americans is an "ethical minefield" because it calls into question "ownership" and interpretation of the past. Larry Echo-Hawk, a member of the Pawnee Nation, legal scholar, and United States Assistant Secretary of the Interior for Indian Affairs under President Barack Obama, said of the excavation of Native American remains, "Regardless of the motive for expropriating Indian graves, the impact of this activity upon the affected Indians is always the same: emotional trauma and spiritual distress."

After the remains of Anzick-1 were excavated in 1968, they were analyzed by several teams of researchers and eventually returned to the Anzick family. The daughter of the Anzick family, Sarah Anzick had become a genetic researcher. She hoped to conduct genomic analysis on the Anzick-1 skeleton. She was cautious because a previous case, involving the ancient remains of a Native American called Kennewick Man, caused a great deal of controversy. Under NAGPRA, US law protects the remains and artifacts of Native Americans found on federal lands or stored by institutions that receive federal funding. It requires restoration of remains and artifacts to tribes associated with the remains or culture. Because Anzick-1 was discovered on private property, Sarah Anzick was not legally required to consult tribal members before conducting analysis of the remains. She discussed her goals with representatives of several Montana tribes that now inhabit the area, to determine whether to use the required techniques (which destroy some material) to analyze the remains of Anzick-1. Because she was unable to achieve consensus, she temporarily gave up the project. She eventually conducted DNA analysis on the remains of Anzick-1.

After the results of the analysis revealed a link between Anzick-1 and modern Native Americans, the team of researchers sought consultation from several Montana tribes. Eske Willerslev, a Danish genetic researcher, visited several Indian reservations in Montana in 2013 to try to engage community members in the decision-making related to the research of Anzick-1. He met with Shane Doyle, who became a co-author of the paper. A member of the Crow tribe, Doyle works in Native American studies at Montana State University. There were mixed opinions about the research conducted on Anzick-1, but many tribal members said that they would prefer to have been contacted before the destructive techniques were performed, not after. The overwhelming response from Montana tribal members was that the remains of Anzick-1 should be reburied according to tribal ritual.

See also
List of unsolved deaths

References 

 White, Samuel Stockton V. 2015. M.A. Thesis: "The Anzick Site: Cultural Balance and the Treatment of Ancient Human Remains (Toward a Collaborative Standard)." Theses, Dissertations, Professional Papers, Missoula, MT: University of Montana, ScholarWorks, Graduate School. https://scholarworks.umt.edu/cgi/viewcontent.cgi?article=5415&context=etd
 White, Samuel Stockton V. 2019 Ph.D. Dissertation "THE ANZICK ARTIFACTS: A HIGH-TECHNOLOGY FORAGER TOOL ASSEMBLAGE" (2019). Graduate Student Theses, Dissertations, & Professional Papers. 11338. https://scholarworks.umt.edu/etd/11338

External links
 "The Great Human Odyssey", Canadian Broadcasting Corporation
 " The Great Human Odyssey", Nova (TV series), PBS

Burials in Montana
Clovis culture
Modern human genetic history
Oldest human remains in the Americas
Unsolved deaths